Tsetsen-Uul is a sum of Zavkhan Province in western Mongolia. In 2008, its population was 2,114.
On January 21, 2016 at 15:00 UTC, the place recorded the world's highest sea-level pressure of 1094.7hPa, which is the origin of the January 2016 East Asia cold wave that brought the coldest weather in decades to many Chinese, Taiwanese and Thai cities.

References 

Districts of Zavkhan Province